The Second Doctor Adventures is a Big Finish Productions audio play series based on the television series Doctor Who. Michael Troughton, son of the original actor Patrick Troughton, voices the role of the Second Doctor.

History
In 1999, beginning with the story The Sirens of Time, Big Finish Productions began producing a series of audio adventures featuring the Fifth Doctor, Sixth Doctor and Seventh Doctor. For 22 years these stories continued collectively known as Big Finish's Main Range. In May 2020, Big Finish announced the main range would conclude in March 2021 and subsequently replaced with regular releases of the first 8 Doctor's adventures continuing in their own respective ranges.

A single boxset for the Second Doctor was announced in May 2021, set for release in July 2022 and titled Beyond War Games. It was announced on 1 January 2022 that Michael Troughton, son of the original actor Patrick Troughton, would voice the role of the Second Doctor.

Cast and characters

Notable Guests 

Nicholas Briggs as The Daleks

Episodes

Series 1: Beyond War Games (2022)

The Second Doctor Adventures 2023 
Another boxset is scheduled for July 2023.

References

Audio plays based on Doctor Who
Big Finish Productions
Doctor Who spin-offs
Second Doctor audio plays